East Twin River may refer to:

 East Twin River (Washington), US
 East Twin River (Wisconsin), US

See also
 East River (disambiguation)